Ode to Gallantry is a wuxia novel by Jin Yong (Louis Cha). It was first serialised in Hong Kong from 11 June 1966 to 19 April 1967 in the newspaper Ming Pao. The novel shares the same Chinese title as a poem by the Tang dynasty poet Li Bai, which was used as its epigraph.

Plot
The plot revolves around a case of mistaken identity between a pair of identical brothers. In the afterword, Jin Yong acknowledges that the story resembles some of the works of William Shakespeare (cf. Twelfth Night and The Comedy of Errors).

The protagonist, who refers to himself as "Gouzazhong" (literally "mongrel"; a colloquialism for "bastard"), first appears as a young beggar roaming the streets of Kaifeng in search of his lost mother. He witnesses a fight between several notable figures in the wulin (martial artists' community) and meets the Shi couple and members of the Snowy Mountain School. An accident causes him to be taken away by Xie Yanke, an eccentric martial artist, to a secluded location on Motian Cliff. Xie Yanke, who is frequently bothered by Gouzazhong, decides to teach him martial arts. Gouzazhong learns qi cultivation techniques under Xie Yanke's tutelage for six years. He is unaware that Xie actually harbours ill intentions and has been deliberately teaching him the techniques wrongly in the hope that he will sustain internal wounds and eventually die.

At the same time, the leader of the Changle School, Shi Zhongyu, mysteriously disappears. The greater part of the novel deals with the complications that arise when Gouzhazhong is mistaken for Shi Zhongyu, not only by members of the school (for ulterior motives), by also by Shi Zhongyu's parents, Shi Zhongyu's lover Ding Dang, and members of the Snowy Mountain School. Although the two bear a splitting resemblance, their characters cannot be more different: Gouzhazhong is simple, honest and clever; Shi Zhongyu, the son of the Shi couple, has a bad reputation for being a lewd and sly womaniser. Gouzhazhong acquires consummate combat skills in the process. He is hounded by members of the Snowy Mountain School who mistake him for Shi Zhongyu, who had molested Axiu, the granddaughter of the Snowy Mountain School's leader. He acquires Axiu as his girlfriend after various incidents, during which their misunderstandings are gradually resolved.

The novel culminates in an episode when the leaders of various schools are coerced into visiting a secluded island by a pair of mysterious, highly skilled messengers to celebrate the Laba Festival. The story then leads to a surprising conclusion: revelations on the island and more revelations concerning Gouzhazhong's true parentage.

Characters

Adaptations

Films

Television

References

 
Novels by Jin Yong
Novels first published in serial form
Works originally published in Ming Pao
Novels set in the Northern Song
Chinese novels adapted into television series